Richard Franklin Preston (October 24, 1860 – February 8, 1929) was an Ontario physician and political figure. He represented Lanark North in the Legislative Assembly of Ontario from 1894 to 1898 and from 1905 to 1919 and Lanark in the House of Commons of Canada from 1922 to 1929 as a Conservative member.

He was born in Leeds County, Canada West, the son of Anthony Preston, an Irish immigrant, and was educated at Queen's University. His older brother Robert Henry Preston was also a physician and politician. Preston ran unsuccessfully for the Lanark North seat in the House of Commons in 1900 and 1904. He served as a minister without portfolio in the provincial cabinet from 1914 to 1919. He was first elected to the House of Commons in a 1922 by-election held after the death of John Alexander Stewart.

Preston was reeve and later mayor of Carleton Place. He also served as warden for Lanark County.

References 
 Canadian Parliamentary Guide, 1912, EJ Chambers

External links 

The Canadian parliamentary companion, 1897 JA Gemmill

1860 births
1929 deaths
Conservative Party of Canada (1867–1942) MPs
Mayors of places in Ontario
Members of the House of Commons of Canada from Ontario
Progressive Conservative Party of Ontario MPPs